The Museum of the Royal Scots (The Royal Regiment) and the Royal Regiment of Scotland is a regimental museum displaying the collections of the Royal Scots and the Royal Regiment of Scotland. It is based in the Royal Scots drill hall (built in 1900) at Edinburgh Castle in Scotland.

History
The museum is located in a former drill hall built for the Royal Scots in 1900. The building was re-opened following refurbishment, as the Royal Scots Museum, by the Princess Royal on 27 June 1991. The Royal Regiment of Scotland has been building its own collection since it was formed in 2006. The collections of the Royal Scots and Royal Regiment of Scotland are currently co-located in the Royal Scots drill hall.

Collections
The history of the Royal Scots and its successor regiment, the Royal Regiment of Scotland, from the founding of the Royal Scots by Sir John Hepburn to recent campaigns in Iraq and Afghanistan is illustrated on a series of wall panels together with dioramas, display cases and other exhibits. The museum holds seven Victoria Crosses awarded to members of the Royal Scots. The medal collection is extensive and therefore only a small proportion of the collection is on display: the rest are in drawers which can be opened on request.

References

Regimental museums in Scotland